Nu tändas tusen juleljus (Now a thousand Christmas candles are lit) is a Christmas album in Swedish, recorded in 1980 by Swedish pop singer and ABBA member Agnetha Fältskog and her daughter Linda Ulvaeus, who was at the time 7 years old.

Album information

The album was co-produced by Fältskog and Michael B. Tretow and recorded in the Polar Studios with the same musicians as on contemporary ABBA recordings. The album was recorded in November 1980 but since it wasn't completed in time for Christmas 1980 it was postponed and not released until nearly a year later, in October 1981. Nu tändas tusen julejus, which was Fältskog's first Swedish language recording for the Polar Music label after having left CBS-Cupol, peaked at No. 6 on the Swedish album chart in January 1982, has been re-released on CD by Polar Music/PolyGram/Universal Music all through the 1990s and 2000s and is one of the best-selling Swedish Christmas albums of all time. The album name is derived from one of Scandinavia's best-known Christmas carols.

Track listing

Weekly charts

Personnel

The following musicians contributed to the recording of Nu tändas tusen juleljus:

Agnetha Fältskog: vocals, producer
Linda Ulvaeus: vocals
Michael B. Tretow: producer, sound engineer
Ola Brunkert: drums
Rutger Gunnarsson: bass
Anders Glenmark: guitar
Åke Sundkvist: percussion
Lasse Westmann: guitar
Kjell Öhman: piano
KOS Kyrkokör, directed by Gerd Hillert, arranged by Lars O. Carlsson

References

Agnetha Fältskog albums
Linda Ulvaeus albums
1981 Christmas albums
Christmas albums by Swedish artists
Pop Christmas albums